This is a List of clubs in the Landesliga Bayern-Süd, including all clubs and their final placings from the first season in 1963–64 to 2010–11. The league, commonly referred to as the Landesliga Süd, is the second-highest football league in the state of Bavaria and the Bavarian football league system. It is one of three Landesligas in Bavarian football, the 6th tier of the German football league system. Until the introduction of the 3. Liga in 2008 it was the 5th tier.

Overview
Since the formation of the league in 1963, it has served as the tier below the Bayernliga, together with the northern and the central division of the Landesliga. Originally a tier-four league, it was demoted to tier-five status in 1994, when the Regionalligas were introduced. In 2008, it was then demoted to tier-six status, when the 3. Liga was established.

Originally, the Bezirksligas were the feeder leagues to the Landesliga Süd, of which there were, for the most part, five, three in Upper Bavaria and two in Bavarian Swabia. From 1988, Bezirksoberligas served as feeder leagues instead, having been established as a new tier between the Landesligas and the Bezirksligas. The two leagues below the Landesliga Süd have since been the Bezirksoberliga Oberbayern and the Bezirksoberliga Schwaben.

Clubs and their placings
The complete list of clubs and placings in the league since the introduction of the league in 1963:

1963–1988
The first 25 seasons from 1963 to 1988:

1988–2012
The last 24 seasons from 1988 to 2012:

Key

 S = No of seasons in league (as of 2011-12)

Notes
 1 The TSV 1860 Munich II withdrew from the league in 1982 after the forced relegation of its first team to the Bayernliga.
 2 The SV Gendorf Burgkirchen withdrew its team from the league in 2004.
 3 The MTV Ingolstadt and ESV Ingolstadt merged in 2004 to form FC Ingolstadt 04.
 4 The football departments of FT Starnberg 09 merged with SpVgg Starnberg to form FC Starnberg in 1992. In 2001, the FC Starnberg was dissolved and the football department re-joined FT Starnberg 09.
 5 The FC Enikon Augsburg folded in 1995.
 6 Türk Gücü München folded in 2001 and reformed as Türkischer SV 1975 München. In 2009, the club merged with SV Ataspor to form SV Türkgücü-Ataspor München.

References

Sources
 Die Bayernliga 1945 - 1997,  published by the DSFS, 1998
 Deutschlands Fußball in Zahlen,  An annual publication with tables and results from the Bundesliga to Verbandsliga/Landesliga, publisher: DSFS
 Süddeutschlands Fussballgeschichte in Tabellenform 1897-1988  History of Southern German football in tables, publisher & author: Ludolf Hyll
 50 Jahre Bayrischer Fussball-Verband  50-year-anniversary book of the Bavarian FA, publisher: Vindelica Verlag, published: 1996

External links 
 Bayrischer Fussball Verband (Bavarian FA) 
 Das deutsche Fussball Archiv Historic German league tables 
 Bavarian League tables and results 
 Website with tables and results from the Bavarian Oberliga to Bezirksliga 

Sud
2